N001 Mech is a Russian (former USSR) all-weather multimode airborne radar developed by the Tikhomirov Scientific Research Institute of Instrument Design (NIIP) for the Su-27 multi-role combat aircraft.

Description
The N001 radar for the Su-27 was designed by Viktor Grishin. Pushing the state of the art for the USSR, the original design, known as Mech, was supposed to draw heavily on technologies developed for the experimental Soyuz radar program led by NPO Istok. It was intended to have a great deal of commonality with the MiG-29's N019 Rubin radar. N001 has a 1.075m antenna diameter twist-cassegrain antenna. A pulse-doppler design operating in the 3 cm band using medium and high PRFs for optimum lookdown capability, the N001 has a search range of 80–100 km against a 3m m RCS target in a headon engagement, 140 km against a large bomber. It can track a 3m target at 65 km. In a pursuit engagement, search range for a 3m target falls to just 40 km. Azimuth limits are ±60.  Initial units had a MTBF of only 5 hours, but later type is 100 hours; MTBF was eventually brought up to 200 hours.  The Su-33 used an updated SUV-33 control system, the N001 radar was largely unchanged but with sea optimised lookdown capability and support for the carrier-based GCI system.

Variants
N001 (RLPK-27)
Standard model.
N001E
Export version of N001.
N001V (RLPK-27V)
Processor replaced TS101M capable of single target engagement and simultaneously tracking 10 targets during an engagement.
N001VE (RLPK-27VE)
Fitted to Chinese Su-30MKK. This will substantially improve air-to-air performance, and increase air-to-ground resolution. N001VE incorporated the moving target indication (MTI) and mapping capabilities, and capability to detect low flying or hovering helicopters. Processor replaced Baguet series BCVM-486-6, capable of simultaneously engaging two of ten targets tracked with semi-active radar homing air-to-air missiles and compatibility for R-77/RVV-AE. Tracking distance is extended up to 70 km.  
N001VEP (RLPK-27VEP)
Fitted to Su-30MK2 and the upgraded Su-27SMx. New processor Baguet series 55-04.02 make it being able to concurrently track 10 targets while engaging up to four air targets or two ground targets. Detection range against fighter aircraft of 150 km and detection range against bomber extended to 300 km. Compatible with advanced anti-surface amunition such as Kh-31 and Kh-35.
N001VEP+Pero 
N001VEP's Twist cassegrain antenna replaced the new Pero passive phased array antenna, developed by NIIP and Ryazan GRPZ. The radar simultaneously engage 6 aerial targets, or 4 ground targets, and Extended up to 190 km detection range against fighter. Also called "Panda".

See also
Tikhomirov Scientific Research Institute of Instrument Design
List of radars

References

External links
Tikomirov Website
Flanker Radars in Beyond Visual Range Air Combat
Overscan's guide to Russian Military Avionics
Russian Knight's History of the Su-27

Aircraft radars
Science and technology in the Soviet Union
Russian and Soviet military radars
Tikhomirov Scientific Research Institute of Instrument Design products
Military equipment introduced in the 1980s